Hotel Splendid is a 5-star hotel in Bečići, Montenegro. The hotel was completely reconstructed between 2005 and 2006.

Hotel’s history
Hotel Splendid is owned and managed by the Montenegro Stars Hotel Group. The management company was established in 2003. In December 2003 a land slot with the building of the former hotel Splendid was bought. Next year it was decided to demolish the old building and construct an entirely new, five-star resort. In February 2005 a first stone was put in the foundation of the future hotel. On July 13, 2006 the Splendid Conference & SPA Resort was opened.

Facilities

Accommodation
The hotel has 322 rooms and suites in total.

Bars & Restaurants
There are 3 restaurants and 4 bars at the hotel premises.

Conference facilities
Hotel Splendid manages the largest convention space in Montenegro.

In the past years hotel Splendid has many times hosted local and international events:

International Conference – Cetinje Parliamentary Forum: Women, Peace and Security – Two Years Later, June 24–26, 2012.

Intergovernmental Commission, People’s Republic of China and Montenegro meeting, June 22, 2012

Western Balkans - Turkey Forum and EU SEED Steering Committee Meeting, June 20 – 22, 2012

Security challenges - Chicago Summit: What can the Western Balkans offer?", June 04–06, 2012

PKCG Conference: "The future of Montenegrin economy", May 29–30, 2012

IX South –East Gathering, May 25–27, 2012

IACP-SEPCA Conference, April 24–26, 2012

Splendid SPA
Splendid SPA is one of the largest SPA centers in the Eastern Adriatic. It is a part of the hotel Splendid Conference & SPA Resort building, SPA is located in the separate, three-storied wing.

Splendid Casino Royale
Splendid Casino Royale was opened in 2010. Located on the 10th floor.

Budva
Hotels in Montenegro
Hotels established in 2006
Hotel buildings completed in 2006